David Lake is an American architect and principal in the Texas firm of LakeFlato with Ted Flato.

Lake grew up in Texas and received his B.S. in Architecture from the University of Texas at Austin in 1976 where he was a student of Pliny Fisk III. His early work was in sustainable design, building modern versions of sod houses in the Texas panhandle. He began his career at Ford Powell & Carson in San Antonio, Texas. His work continues to be noted for attention to sustainability.

Notable buildings
 Congregation Agudas Achim — Austin, Texas (2001)
 World Birding Center Headquarters — Mission, Texas (2004)
 Government Canyon Visitor Center — Helotes, Texas (2005)
 Lake Tahoe Residence — Glenbrook, Nevada (2003)

Awards
 Recipient, AIA Architecture Firm Award, 2004
Global Award for Sustainable Architecture 2013, along with his partner Ted Flato.

References

Further reading

External links
LakeFlato Official Site

1950s births
Architects from San Antonio
Architects from Texas
University of Texas at Austin School of Architecture alumni
Living people